Slavey Raychev (born 29 October 1943) is a former Bulgarian basketball player. He competed in the men's tournament at the 1968 Summer Olympics.

References

1943 births
Living people
Bulgarian men's basketball players
Olympic basketball players of Bulgaria
Basketball players at the 1968 Summer Olympics
Place of birth missing (living people)